Birpara Tea Garden (or simply Birpara) is a village, a tea garden and two gram panchayats in the Madarihat-Birpara CD block in the Alipurduar subdivision of the Alipurduar district  in the state of West Bengal, India.

Geography

Location
 
According to the map of the Madarihat CD block on page 193 in the District Census Handbook, Jalpaiguri, 2011 census, Birpara police station is shown as being a part of Birpara Tea Garden village/ mouza.

Birpara Tea Garden spared a portion of their cultivable land for the establishment of Birpara town, many years ago. Over the years, it has developed as an important town in the area.

Area overview
Alipurduar district is covered by two maps. It is an extensive area in the eastern end of the Dooars in West Bengal. It is undulating country, largely forested, with numerous rivers flowing down from the outer ranges of the Himalayas in Bhutan. It is a predominantly rural area with 79.38% of the population living in the rural areas. The district has 1 municipal town and 20 census towns and that means 20.62% of the population lives in urban areas. The scheduled castes and scheduled tribes, taken together, form more than half the population in all the six community development blocks in the district. There is a high concentration of tribal people (scheduled tribes) in the three northern blocks of the district.

Note: The map alongside presents some of the notable locations in the subdivision. All places marked in the map are linked in the larger full screen map.

Civic administration

Police station
Birpara police station has jurisdiction over a part of the Madarihat-Birpara CD block.

Demographics
According to the 2011 Census of India, Birpara Tea Garden had a total population of 42,080 of which 21,226 (50%) were males and 20,854 (50%) were females. There were 4,788 persons in the age range of 0 to 6 years. The total number of literate people in Birpara Tea Garden was 28,020 (75.14% of the population over 6 years).

Economy

In 1859, a young Scottish merchant, Walter Duncan, started business ventures in India. Initiated as Playfair Duncan company, it grew as Duncan Brothers, amongst the earliest companies being Birpara Tea Company and Anglo-India Jute Mills. The Goenka family took over Duncan Brothers in 1951, and under the leadership of G.P.Goenka, diversified substantially and emerged as one of the top business houses in the country. The Tea Division of Duncans has nine tea gardens in the Dooars – Birpara, Hantapara, Dumchipara, Lankapara, Tulsipara, Garganda, Killot, Nagaisuri, Bagracote – and one garden in the Terai region at Gungram. The company has been regularly carrying out uprooting, replanting and rejuvenation of tea areas. It has high quality clonal gardens and has expanded substantially over the years. Birpara Tea Estate has 798.78 hectares of mature tea and 128.65 hectares of young tea. In 1998-99, it produced 1.817 million kg of tea. Yields in Duncan gardens are double that of the national average.

The Tea Division of the Duncan Goenka group has been facing rough weather on the labour front and has been in the news. As per newspaper reports, there is likelihood of ownership change.

Transport
There is a station at Dalgaon, nearby, on the New Jalpaiguri-Alipurduar-Samuktala line.

Education
Birpara College was established in 1986. Affiliated with the University of North Bengal, it offers honours courses in Bengali, Nepali, geography, history, sociology, a general course in arts, and honours and general courses in commerce.

References

Villages in Alipurduar district